The Party for Democracy and Progress, commonly known as Chadema, is a center-right political party in Tanzania.

Chadema is the second-largest political party in Tanzania and campaigns on regional autonomous of self-governing states in the country.

History
In the 1995 general election, the party won 4 out of 269 seats in the National Assembly and 41 councillors nationwide.

In 2000 election, the party did not have the presidential candidate but it won five seats in National Assembly elections held on the same day, along with 75 Councillors and three district councils: Kigoma, Karatu, and Tarime.

In the 2005 elections Chadema's presidential candidate, Freeman Mbowe, finished third out of ten candidates, with 5.88% of the vote. Chadema further increased its share in the national assembly as it continued becoming more and more popular, especially among younger people, and the party managed to install eleven members of parliament, in addition to 103 Councillors and the Chadema party retained the district councils of Kigoma, Tarime, and Karatu.

In the 2010 general elections, Chadema substantially increased its share of the national vote. Dr. Willibrod Slaa, Secretary-General of the party until August 2015, gained 27.1% of the vote in the presidential election, a substantial increase from the 5.88% of the vote gained by the Chadema candidate in the 2005 election. The party also won 48 seats, making it the second-largest party in the National Assembly. This was a first for the party. A further 467 Councillors and 7 District Councils were claimed by Chadema. Most of the seats won by Chadema (geographically) are constituencies found in major towns and urban areas of Tanzania, including Arusha, Moshi, Mwanza, Mbeya, and Dar es Salaam, the latter of which is Tanzania’s financial capital and its largest city.

In the general election of October 2015, Chadema joined with other political parties: CUF (Civil United Front), NLD (National League for Democracy), and NCCR-Mageuzi to form Umoja wa Katiba ya Wananchi (UKAWA) and the union was represented by one presidential candidate, Edward Lowassa.

Electoral history

Presidential elections

Bunge elections

References

External links
Chadema official website

1992 establishments in Tanzania
Anti-corruption parties
Conservative parties in Africa
International Democrat Union member parties
Political parties established in 1992
Political parties in Tanzania